Huhtasuo is one of the districts of Jyväskylä, Finland. It is located about 3–8 kilometers from the city center to the northeast. Kangaslampi, Sulku, Varikko, Huhtakeskus and Kaakkolampi are subareas of the district. Along with the Kangasvuori district, Huhtasuo district is a part of the Huhtasuo ward. 

Huhtasuo is a multicultural area, and has big number of immigrants compared to the other areas in Jyväskylä. The population of Huhtasuo was 4,542 in 2020.

Huhtasuo has many services, such as a library, a health center, a church, a school, a convenience store and a grocery store. Most of the houses in Huhtasuo are apartment buildings that were built in the 1970s and 1980s. There are also row houses and single-family houses in the area.

Gallery

References 

Neighbourhoods of Jyväskylä